Russellville Regional Airport  is a city-owned public-use airport located two nautical miles (3.7 km) southeast of the central business district of Russellville, a city in Pope County, Arkansas, United States. According to the FAA's National Plan of Integrated Airport Systems for 2009–2013, it is categorized as a general aviation facility. It was formerly known as Russellville Municipal Airport.

Although many U.S. airports use the same three-letter location identifier for the FAA and IATA, this facility is assigned RUE by the FAA but has no designation from the IATA

Facilities and aircraft 
It has one runway designated 7/25 with an asphalt surface measuring 5,094 by 75 feet (1,553 x 23 m).

For the 12-month period ending October 31, 2007, the airport had 25,100 aircraft operations, an average of 68 per day: 80% general aviation, 18% air taxi, and 2% military. At that time there were 51 aircraft based at this airport: 90% single-engine, 8% multi-engine and 2% helicopter.

References

External links 
 Airport page  at City of Russellville website
 Aerial image as of 25 February 1994 from USGS The National Map
 

Airports in Arkansas
Transportation in Pope County, Arkansas
Buildings and structures in Pope County, Arkansas